Mercy is the eighth studio album by American punk rock band The Men. It was released on February 14, 2020 under Sacred Bones Records.

Release
The announcement of the album, along with the first single "Children All Over the World", was released on January 9, 2020. The second single from the album, "Breeze" was released on January 30, 2020.

Critical reception
Mercy was met with "generally favorable" reviews from critics. At Metacritic, which assigns a weighted average rating out of 100 to reviews from mainstream publications, this release received an average score of 67, based on 6 reviews. Aggregator Album of the Year gave the release a 66 out of 100 based on a critical consensus of 6 reviews.

Track listing

References

2020 albums
The Men (punk band) albums
Sacred Bones Records albums